Gan Regional Hospital is located on the island of Gan in Laamu Atoll, Maldives. It is part of the Atoll Hospital health authority.

Notes

External links 
 Gan Regional Hospital 

Hospitals in the Maldives
Hospitals with year of establishment missing